Greenfield High School is a public high school in Greenfield,  Wisconsin, United States. It serves grades 9-12 for the Greenfield School District.

History 

Construction began on the original Greenfield High School on December 16, 1957, shortly after the City of Greenfield was incorporated. The 47-acre site on the corner of Layton Avenue and South 60th Street was purchased for $65,000. Though construction continued, it opened for the first day of school September 12, 1958 with an assembly in the unfinished cafeteria. The school was officially dedicated on June 14, 1959.

In 2010, a new high school was built at a cost of $41 million. The school includes a school store, a remodeled cafeteria, and a fitness center. An academic wing was built to replace the wing from the original school. In addition, a new gymnasium was built to supplement the existing "Hawk Dome". The natatorium had its ribbon cutting on January 8, 2010. Athletic facilities include a track, tennis courts, and baseball, soccer, and football fields.

Academics
Greenfield is accredited by Cognia.

Athletics
Greenfield's Hustlin' Hawks are members of the Woodland Conference. School colors are forest green and Vegas gold. The following Wisconsin Interscholastic Athletic Association (WIAA) sports are offered:

Baseball (boys) 
Basketball (girls and boys) 
Cross country (girls and boys) 
Football (boys)
Golf (boys) 
Soccer (girls and boys) 
Softball (girls) 
Swimming and diving (girls and boys) 
Tennis (girls and boys) 
Track and field (girls and boys) 
Volleyball (girls and boys) 
Wrestling (boys)

Notable alumni
 Matt Turk, National Football League (NFL) punter
Dan Nimmer, Pianist for Wynton Marsalis

References

External links
 

Educational institutions established in 1957
Public high schools in Wisconsin
Schools in Milwaukee County, Wisconsin
1957 establishments in Wisconsin